Mary Stuart, Countess of Bute, 1st Baroness Mount Stuart (19 January 1718 – 6 November 1794) was the wife of British nobleman John Stuart, 3rd Earl of Bute, who served as Prime Minister from 1762 to 1763.

Life and family

Lady Bute was born in 1718, the only daughter of Sir Edward Wortley Montagu and Lady Mary Pierrepont, the daughter of Evelyn Pierrepont, 1st Duke of Kingston-upon-Hull. She was born during her father's tenure as ambassador to the Ottoman Empire, which her mother wrote about in her Letters from Turkey.

On 24 August 1736, she married John Stuart, 3rd Earl of Bute, who became the prime minister of Great Britain in 1762. The couple had five sons and six daughters, including:
 Lady Mary Stuart ( – 5 April 1824), married James Lowther, later created Earl of Lonsdale, on 7 September 1761
 John Stuart, Lord Mount Stuart (30 June 1744 – 16 November 1814), politician who succeeded as 4th Earl of Bute and was later created Marquess of Bute
 Lady Anne Stuart (born ), married Hugh Percy, Lord Warkworth, later the 2nd Duke of Northumberland, on 2 July 1764
 The Hon James Archibald Stuart (19 September 1747 – 1 March 1818), politician and author
 Lady Augusta Stuart ( – 12 February 1778), married Andrew Corbett
 Lady Jane Stuart ( – 28 February 1828), married George Macartney, later created Earl Macartney, on 1 February 1768
 The Hon Frederick Stuart (1751–1802), politician
 The Hon Charles Stuart (January 1753 – 25 May 1801), soldier and politician
 The Hon William Stuart (March 1755 – 6 March 1822), Anglican prelate who served as Archbishop of Armagh 
 Lady Caroline Stuart (before 1763 – 20 January 1813), married The Hon John Dawson, later the 1st Earl of Portarlington, on 1 January 1778
 Lady Louisa Stuart (12 August 1757 – 4 August 1851), writer who died unmarried

In 1761, she was created Baroness Mount Stuart, of Wortley in the county of York, with a remainder to her male heirs by her husband.

Lady Bute died on 6 November 1794 in Isleworth, Middlesex. Her eldest son, John, succeeded to her title.

Perception
In 1774, Mary Delany wrote to her friend Bernard Granville, Jacobite Duke of Albemarle, saying: "You know so much of Lady Bute that I need say nothing of her agreeableness, her good sense, and good principles, which with great civility must be always pleasing."

Writing for the Oxford Dictionary of National Biography, Karl Wolfgang Schweizer said that: "Lady Bute seems to have been a woman of prudence, loyalty, and tact, greatly devoted to her husband and family."

References

1718 births
1794 deaths
Scottish countesses
Spouses of prime ministers of the United Kingdom
Wives of knights
Hereditary peeresses of Great Britain created by George III
Mount Stuart
Mary Stuart, Countess of Bute